Molybdenum(II) bromide is an inorganic compound with the formula MoBr2. It forms yellow-red crystals.

Preparation
Molybdenum(II) bromide is created by the reaction of elemental molybdenum(II) chloride with lithium bromide.

References

Molybdenum dibromide at Web Elements

Bromides
Molybdenum halides
Molybdenum(II) compounds